This is a list of characters from the multimedia franchise PriPara.

Playable characters

SoLaMi Smile

Laala Manaka is a bright and cheerful fifth-grade elementary student of Paprika Private Academy with an exceptionally loud voice, which she apparently inherited from her mother. She initially sings very softly to make up for her loudness. Her catchphrase is "Kashikoma!", which roughly translates to "Got It!" Her theme color is pink and her preferred brand is Twinkle Ribbon, a Lovely-type brand that produces girly clothing with lots of ribbons and girly motifs. Outside of PriPara, Laala has somewhat long, purple hair styled into two buns. However, after undergoing her PriPara change, her hair becomes much longer, turning her hairbuns into pigtails. She also becomes taller after her change, as opposed to her "normal" self - which retains the appearance of a 12-year-old girl.

Mirei Minami is a bubbly novice idol who makes friends with Laala after she enters PriPara world.
Although she seems energetic and spirited, she is only like this as her "idol character". In real life, Mirei is a Head Disciplinarian in Paprika Private Academy, who is two years above Laala and constantly issues penalty tickets to her whenever she breaks school rules.  She is much more serious and stern in real life compared to when she is in PriPara. Mirei's theme color is light blue and her preferred brand is Candy Alamode, a Pop-type brand that uses candies and desserts as the main motif. As the Head Disciplinarian, she holds herself in a composed, serious manner - which she describes as a "complete 180" from her original self. Normally, she has plain brown hair tied up into a ponytail and wears a pair of eyeglasses. However, after her PriPara change, she gains bright blonde hair that appears shorter and more curled. Her eye color also changes from brown to blue and her glasses disappear during the change.

Sophy Hojo is a Major Class idol in the PriPara world and a student from Paprika Private Academy. She is three years older than Laala. Despite being described as a cool, ladylike idol, Sophy was born with a weak body, so she is normally aloof, directionless and not accustomed to doing anything by herself. In order to perform well and maintain a cool and ladylike appearance in front of her fans, she energizes herself using the sourness of pickled plums, which she affectionately calls "Red Flash". After meeting Laala, who accidentally discovers her true identity, she starts to become more determined to succeed on her own strength and joins Laala's idol unit SoLaMi Smile. Her theme color is reddish violet and her preferred brand is Holic Trick, a Cool-type brand that produces Gothic Lolita clothing.

Dressing Pafé

 (Japanese)
Sion is a student at Laala's school, in the same year with Mirei, but is in a different class. Calm, yet fiery, Sion is a world-renowned champion at Go, but has retired from playing due to nobody being able to beat her in the field. Sion decides to conquer the idol world instead by creating a new Idol Unit called Dressing Pafe managed by Usagi, and makes it her mission to beat SoLaMi♡SMILE (Laala, Mirei, and Sophy). Her theme color is green and her preferred brand is Baby Monster, a Cool-type brand.

 (Dorothy) and Yuki Wakai (Reona)
In Episode 12, it is revealed that she has a twin, Reona, with whom she had planned on performing for the Sparkling Grand Prix. 

Dorothy has a very vibrant and tomboyish personality, as evidenced by her use of the pronoun , which is often used by males. In contrast, Reona is meek, shy and not very talkative, and relies heavily on his sister, but is gradually starting to become more independent. Dorothy's catchphrase is "Tension max!", while Reona's catchphrase is "(Tension) relax!". Their theme colors are blue (Dorothy) and red (Reona) and they both share the same preferred brand, Fortune Party, a Pop-type brand.

Gaarmageddon

In Paprika Private Academy, Aroma is a girl in the same year with Laala but from a different class. She has a demonic character both in and out of PriPara, which she developed in preschool as a way to overcome her shyness. She is also best friends with Mikan and the two form an angel and devil double act both in and out of PriPara. Her theme color is indigo and her preferred brand is LOVE DEVI, formerly Holic Trick Classic (a spin-off of Holic Trick).

Mikan is a sweet, angelic idol who is Aroma's best friend. She refers to herself in the third person, and often ends her sentences with "-nano" or "-gel". Her theme color is pastel blue and her preferred brand is Silky Heart, a Lovely-type brand

Gaaruru is a vocal doll that represents the negative feelings of girls who believe they can't become idols. Gaaruru is known to be spoiled, mischievous and a troublemaker and causes many problems for those around her. She's very disobedient and is unwilling to listen, and she often growls and bites those who try to talk to her. Gaaruru also appears to not be fond of others and would always be by herself according to Falulu. She also doesn't appear to like idols, as well as dancing and singing. Later, after eating one of Sophy's pickled plums, it's revealed that Gaaruru had swallowed a "Spiny Bug" which turned out to be the source of her bad behavior, which caused her to be jealous of those who could sing and dance well. After that realization, Gaaruru decided that she wanted to become a "Kaijū (怪獣 lit. monster) idol".

Tricolore 

Debuts in season 2. Hibiki is a first year in high school and the grandchild of one of Paprika Private Academy's chairman investors. Initially she is seen as a caring figure, always appearing to help Fuwari out and encouraging her to do well in becoming a princess. However when Fuwari decides not to become a princess, she becomes more hostile, revealing she was only acting in her own interests. She plans to form the perfect Dream Team to win the Dream Idol Grand Prix in order to reform PriPara as a place where only the best idols can go, rather than a place of fun and friendship. To do this, she steals the Summer and Autumn Dream Parade Coords from Dressing Flower and Cosmic Omurice da Vinci under a disguise she calls Kaitou Genius. However, she reveals herself to be Kaitou Genius in Episode 73 and returns the Dream Tickets to Dressing Flower and Cosmic Omurice da Vinci in the same episode. She is a Celeb idol, and her theme color is silver and her preferred brand is Brilliant Prince. 

Falulu is a mysterious vocal doll created out of the desire that girls have to become idols.. Initially, Falulu is very clueless and naive, and seems to know very few words; so she tends to repeat the words and actions of others, most notably Laala. Her voice also sounds slightly robotic. She tends to call certain things (like the Prism Voice and Laala) sparkling. Her mascot Unicorn often guides her but she shows some increasing intelligence as the series progresses, as well as developing a strong friendship with Laala. Her theme color is lime green and her preferred brand is Marionette Mu, a Lovely brand that produces princess-like clothing. 

Fuwari is a PriPara princess candidate who has come to Paprika Private Academy from EuroPara (Europe) by invitation from Hibiki. Like what her name states, Fuwari is gentle and kind. Her theme color is green and her preferred brand is CoCo Flower, which is a Natural-type brand. While she first entered PriPara in Episode 50, she wasn't able to début as an idol due to her having no matching brand. However, after Cosmo makes her a brand of a new type, she was able to début in Episode 52. She decides in episode 55 that she will stop her training to become a princess candidate after playing with Laala and Dressing Pafé in the school playground. She also appears to have feelings for Hibiki but when Hibiki reveals she is female, Fuwari becomes confused and returns to the Palps. Eventually Fuwari comes to understand her feelings and returns to Parajuku to become friends with Hibiki. Hibiki initially rebuffs her offer but later comes to accept Fuwari as her friend.

NonSugar

Non began as a supporting character in season 1. She is Laala's younger sister. She is more level-headed than Laala, but looks up to her big sister. She is a big fan of Falulu and hopes to be able to attend PriPara herself one day.

In season 3, she finally receives her PriTicket and attends PriPara under the alternate identity of Kanon. With help from Jewlie, she's also able to choose her other two idol identities, Pinon and Junon. However, later on, she would change her PriPara appearance from that of Kanon to something more resembling herself, with a lavender theme color and a preferred brand of Twinkle Ribbon Sweet. Like Laala, she also appears older when inside PriPara. Eventually, Non will form an Idol Unit called NonSugar with Chili and Pepper.

She briefly debuted in the beginning of season 3 when she just received her PriTicket and had an entry tour with Laala. Originally, she wanted to be a lovely type idol just like Laala sharing the brand Twinkle Ribbon with a pastel green theme color. However when she reappears in episode 113 it is revealed she has become a celebrity type idol after her mic was upgraded with a Celeb Jewel and now uses Dear Crown along with a emerald theme color. In her celeb personality, she acts more mature but slightly arrogant in PriPara. This change makes her want to stop coming to PriPara as she explains to Laala and her friends. After spending time with Non and Pepper, her personalities both inside and outside of PriPara begin to change and she becomes good friends with her fellow idols.

Pepper is hyper, tomboyish, and childish, and likes running around and jumping through the trees. She seems to be constantly hungry, as when she is seen hunting the various mascots and animals in PriPara.She made brief appearances in episode 108, 109 and 115 but makes her official anime debut in episode 116 when she comes to Parajuku's PriPara. She is a natural type idol and her preferred brand is Sunny Zoo.

TRiANGLE
TRiANGLE is a virtual idol group completely designed and portrayed by Non herself during the first phase of the Divine Idol Grand Prix. Each member of the team consists of Non as her perfect example of each type of idol, Lovely, Pop and Cool. As Non is only able to portray one idol at a time, she records herself as the other two idols, then with Usacha's help, projects a holographic representation of those idols to appear onstage along her.

She is Non's Lovely and default identity (until episode 101) and wears Rosette Jewel coords with flower decorations. She is sweet and cute, showing a humble and shy nature - even after flooring the competition with her performance skills.

She is Non's Cool identity and wears Rosette Jewel brand coords with butterfly decorations. She displays a stoic and cool attitude. She is highly serious and boasts a considerable level of high intelligence. She is competitive towards those she deems a threat, but despite appearing distant, she was able to capture attention with ease from others.

She is Non's Pop identity and wears Rosette Jewel brand coords with star decorations. She is very lively and energetic, and ends her sentences with ~pippi. Dorothy notes that she is like a combination of her, Mirei, and Ajimi.

Other Idols

Cosmo is Sophy's elder sister. Due to the fact that her parents are traveling overseas, she's Sophy's current custodian. She's a popular fashion designer and is in charge of most of the PriPara world's idol clothes and brands. She has encouraged Sophy to be an idol since her childhood. Her catch word is "Cosmic!!". She and Ajimi are also old friends and both attended a design course in Paris, where Cosmo trained to become the designer she is today. Despite not being a recurring idol in the show, she is playable in the arcade game and her preferred brand is Prism Stone. She is also an original character inherited from previous Pretty Rhythm Rainbow Live series' 3DS title "Kira Kira My☆Design".
  

Meganee Akai is a recurring character throughout the Pretty Rhythm series. She is one of the supporting characters in PriPara and a staff member at Prism Stone. She is a cheery, kind, and friendly person, and is always helpful and supportive. Despite having a similar name and appearance, there is no indication that she and Meganii Akai, another recurring character, are related.

Ajimi is the new art teacher to Paprika Private Academy. Possibly stemming from the stereotype that all artists are eccentric, she herself can be considered such as well. She has a highly energetic personality, which causes her to sometimes come off as immature. Despite her energy and seeming lack of maturity, Ajimi is a friendly person. She is also Cosmo's old friend from when the two attended a design course in Paris when they were younger. She is a Pop idol and her preferred brand is Candy à La Mode More, a spin-off of Mirei's Candy à La Mode.

Jewlie is a Goddess who Meganii reveals is to be the special guest at the Parajuku PriPara Divine Idol Grand Prix. She first appears in episode 93 when Laala enters the Divine Challenge Live after her performance with SoLaMi Smile. Like in the arcade game, she gives Laala the Cyalume Baton, which she combines with her mic so she may perform the challenge live. She then awards Laala a Super Cyalume Coord. 

Debuted in season 3. A mysterious baby which Laala finds in PriPara, she believes Laala to be her mother so Laala decides to take care of her. She is very mischievous, appearing and disappearing in Laala's company, causing all of Laala's friends to think she is seeing things. In episode 94 Meganii reveals that Jewlulu is Jewlie in her infant form, after which each of the idols has a turn in looking after her.

Janis is a Goddess and the twin sister of Jewlie, and her job is to support Jewlie from the shadows and she is not supposed to be seen. In episode 118, it reveals that she has been against her sister's will to become an idol in order to protect the PriPara system from loss of control. She had been hiding in Chili's compact and was heard giving Chili orders to attend PriPara in some previous episodes, even though Chili was afraid of her celeb alter ego and refused to go. She reveals a secret plan to take control of the Divine Idol Grand Prix from her sister by stealing the Cyalume Baton and wants Chili to help her but Chili refuses to be pushed around by Janis any longer. Eventually, thanks to NonSugar, Janis begins to open up and see the error of her ways. Jewlie eventually hands control of the Grand Prix over to Janis at the close of the Grand Prix, but Janis attempts to sacrifice herself to save her sister causing both Goddesses to disappear.

Anime-only characters

Mascot Managers

Mirei and Laala's mascot manager. He's often worried about Laala and Mirei when it comes to schedule, and appears to have a quick temper. He says "~kuma" at the end of every sentence, and harbors a strong hatred for Usagi.

Sophy's former mascot manager and Kuma's arch-rival. He's a flamboyant mascot who constantly mocks Kuma. Selfish and uncaring, he is also shown to be obsessively trying to maintain his reputation. He is dropped by Sophy when she joins SoLaMi♡SMILE. He later hires Dressing Pafé, he became very boastful of them since they made an amazing debut. He says "~usa" at the end of his sentences.

Unicorn is Falulu's mascot manager. She also acts as Falulu's guide, telling her what to do and where to go. She is also known to be quite strict and stern towards Falulu.

Neko debuted in season 2 as Mikan and Aroma's manager. She runs her own mascot bar, where she lures Kuma and Usagi in, tricking and lying about curses to Aroma's advantage. However, as the series progresses, Neko becomes more friendly and is shown to act in the best interests of Aroma and Mikan, such as reminding Mikan about Aroma's birthday and helping her make a surprise birthday cake.

Debuted season 2 as Fuwari's manager. She is given the title "The Bird of Misfortune" because many unfortunate things happen within her presence. She often acts and says things that are pessimistic, always seeing the negative side of things. Initially she is afraid of everything and everyone, and even rebuffs Fuwari's offer to become her manager. But after attempting to rescue Fuwari from a river, which results in Toriko ending up in the river and being rescued by Fuwari, Toriko decides to become Fuwari's manager.

Usacha is the younger sister of Usagi. She is noted for being very cute and according to Dorothy, she looks nothing like Usagi. She only appeared in one episode of season 2 but returns in season 3 as the manager of Triangle and later, after Triangle is exposed, NonSugar.

Ham is a hamster mascot, and he is Ajimi's manager and her partner at the PriPara police department.

Recurring characters 

Meganii Akai is a popular PriPara songwriter and has written songs for Dressing Pafé and SoLaMi♡SMILE. He is a very kind, calm individual much like Meganee. He has a gentleman-like personality, but enjoys to keep his many idols on their toes with new ideas and competitions, which attracts many idols' attention.

Risa is Laala and Non's mother. She runs the Papa Pasta restaurant with her husband. In episode 24 it is revealed she attended PriPara when she was Laala's age and became friends with Gloria Ookanda under the name Himeka. Afterwards she is often seen attending PriPara with Gloria to perform and watch her daughters' performances.

Gloria is a supporting character in PriPara. She is the Headmistress of Paprika Private Academy. For the first half of season one, she has a deep seated hatred of PriPara and refuses to allow the elementary schoolers to attend. She forcefully confiscated their PriTickets using a handheld vacuum, nicknamed Rina. When she proceeds to confiscate the middle schoolers tickets, it leads Laala and her friends to discover the reason for her hatred of PriPara. It is revealed she was once an idol named Sugar who was betrayed by her friend Himeka when she never showed up to meet outside of PriPara, as they promised. Since then Gloria has had a hatred of PriPara and friendship. Laala however manages to convince her of the error in her judgement, leading her to reunite with Himeka, who turns out to be Laala's mother, Risa. After this, Gloria lifts her ban on PriPara and returns everyone's tickets.

Nao is Laala's best friend. At the start of the series she reveals to Laala she received her Priticket before it is taken away by Gloria. She becomes a fan of Laala without realising who she is until episode 8 when Laala confides in her.

Sadoka is a female middle school student at Paprika Private Academy, and is the leader of the Sophy Fan Club, who supports and protects Sophy Hojo.

Chanko is a female middle school student at Paprika Private Academy and is a member of the Royal Guard. She has the appearance of a sumo wrestler and often uses sumo actions and quotes in her personality. She is also often seen posing in swimwear in cut away scenes as a running gag throughout the series. She gets her idol debut in the movie "PriPara: Everyone's Yearning Let's Go☆PriParis".
Chanko, wanting to perform in Divine Idol Grand Prix, manages to join Cosmo and Ajimi, who were looking for their third member after Q・P☆Cosmix' disbandment. They formed "Ucchari Big-Bang" and made into Grand Prix' finals.

Haruki is a male middle school student at Paprika Private Academy. He has a huge crush on Mirei but has yet to reveal his true feelings despite trying very hard to tell her. He is very supportive of Mirei and often tries to impress her.

Nene is a female middle school student at Paprika Private Academy debuting in episode 16. She enjoys journalism and is initially asked by Gloria to find out if Laala attends PriPara secretly. At first she is shown to hate PriPara as she is jealous of idols, but thanks to Laala she has a change of heart and becomes an idol herself. She is also often seen sneaking around looking for exciting news stories.
 / 

Eiko is a supporting character in PriPara. She can sometimes be seen in the crowd during Laala & Mirei's performances. Eiko is a kind, emotional girl who can become easily attached towards others and befriend them; even going as far as to pledge herself to be Laala's number one fan just shortly after her debut. 

Love is a supporting character in PriPara. She is a tennis player from Pararis Girls school and was first introduced in the anime in Episode 4, but had her major debut in Episode 10. Her main brand is Holic Trick and her normal coord in PriPara is the Lunatic Moon Coord. She is very shy around others, and gets easily flustered.

Nanami is an idol in the PriPara world. She is the leader of the idol group Pink Actress with her team mates Momo and Sakura. Her catchphrase is "Kyupikon".

Ran is a girl Laala met in Episode 17 and again in episode 68 during Halloween in PriPara. She has a talent for special effects make-up. Ran is a girl who tries to be scary, but often fails due to her cute appearance. She is somewhat mischievous yet is a very nice girl and very energetic. Ran loves horror and scary things and because of that she wants to make that her profession and become a special effects artist in Hollywood (which she refers to as "Horriwood"). However, because she couldn't scare anyone, Ran had lost confidence in herself, but with Laala's help she got it back.

Ando is Hibiki's butler who tends to Hibiki's need. Despite appearing to carry out Hibiki's orders without question, he cares deeply for his mistress and will defy her if need be, such as when he informs Laala and her friends of Hibiki's plan to become a vocal doll. Hibiki dismisses him after this betrayal but reinstates him after being rescued by Laala and her Dream Team. He is able to come to PriPara disguised as a goat and has an unusual friendship with the local goat population. He also appears to function as a manager figure similar to Kuma and Usagi.

Saints are a legendary idol trio. Three years before the events of the series, they disbanded after their final concert. The three members of Saints were Aira Harune, Mia Hanazono and Naru Ayase, which are the parallel versions of the protagonists from each of the Pretty Rhythm series. In PriPara the Movie: Everyone, Assemble! Prism ☆ Tours, their original alteregos from Pretty Rhythm series briefly appear together. Mia Hanazono later makes appearances in Idol Time PriPara.

References

Music video games
Japanese idols in anime and manga
2014 video games